Silvano Abbà (3 July 1911 – 24 August 1942) was an Italian modern pentathlete who won a bronze medal at the 1936 Summer Olympics. Abbà was a military man, who led the Italian Savoy Cavalry squadron in August 1942 at the Charge of the Savoia Cavalleria at Isbuscenskij near Stalingrad. Abbà was killed, along with 32 other riders who were killed by the Soviets. It is considered the last cavalry charge in military history and was won by the Italian Savoia Cavalleria regiment, led by Colonel Alessandro Bettoni Cazzago.

References

1911 births
1942 deaths
Italian male modern pentathletes
Olympic modern pentathletes of Italy
Olympic bronze medalists for Italy
Olympic medalists in modern pentathlon
Modern pentathletes at the 1936 Summer Olympics
Medalists at the 1936 Summer Olympics
Italian military personnel killed in World War II
Recipients of the Gold Medal of Military Valor
20th-century Italian people